Eucalyptus tortilis is a species of mallet and a gimlet that is endemic to the southwest of Western Australia. It has smooth bark, lance-shaped adult leaves, flower buds in groups of seven, creamy white flowers and hemispherical to cup-shaped fruit.

Description
It has smooth, shiny greenish or copper-coloured bark. Flowering occurs in May and the flowers are creamy white.<ref name="Telopea">{{cite journal |last1=Johnson |first1=Lawrence |last2=Hill |first2=Ken |title=Systematic studies in the eucalypts - 2. A revision of the gimlets and related species; Eucalyptus extracortical series Salubres and Annulatae (Myrtaceae) |journal=Telopea |date=1991 |volume=4 |issue=2 |pages=209–210}}</ref>

Taxonomy and namingEucalyptus tortilis was first formally described in 1991 by Lawrie Johnson and Ken Hill in the journal Telopea from specimens collected east of Norseman in 1983. The specific epithet (tortilis) is a Latin word meaning "twisted", referring to the twisted gimlet trunk.E. tortilis  is one of the nine gimlet species. Six of these, including E. tortilis have buds in groups of seven, the others being E. campaspe, the mallee E. effusa, E. jimberlanica, E. salubris, E. ravida and E. terebra''. The other three gimlets have flower buds in groups of three.

Distribution and habitat
This gimlet is found on flats and rises between Kalgoorlie and Esperance in the Goldfields-Esperance region where it grows in calcareous loamy soils.

Conservation status
This eucalypt is classified as "not threatened" by the Western Australian Government Department of Parks and Wildlife.

See also
List of Eucalyptus species

References

tortilis
Endemic flora of Western Australia
Mallees (habit)
Myrtales of Australia
Eucalypts of Western Australia
Plants described in 1991
Taxa named by Lawrence Alexander Sidney Johnson
Taxa named by Ken Hill (botanist)